Revelation 11 is the eleventh chapter of the Book of Revelation or the Revelation of Jesus Christ shown to John in the New Testament of the Christian Bible. The book is traditionally attributed to John the Apostle, but the precise identity of the author remains a point of academic debate. This chapter contains the accounts related to the sounding of the "Seventh Trumpet".

Text

The original text was written in Koine Greek. This chapter is divided into 19 verses.

Textual witnesses
Some early manuscripts containing the text of this chapter are among others:
Papyrus 115 (ca. AD 275; extant verses 1-5, 8-15, 18-19)
Papyrus 47 (3rd century)
Uncial 0308 (ca. 350; extant verses 15-18)
Codex Sinaiticus (330-360)
Codex Alexandrinus (400-440)
Codex Ephraemi Rescriptus (ca. 450; extant verses 4-19)

The two witnesses (11:1–6)

Verse 1
Then I was given a reed like a measuring rod. And the angel stood “Rise and measure the temple of God, the altar, and those who worship there."
"Then": in Greek  kai, meaning "and"; translated as "then" here to 'indicate the implied sequence within the narrative'.

Verse 2
[The angel said:] "But leave out the court which is outside the temple, and do not measure it, for it has been given to the Gentiles. And they will tread the holy city underfoot for forty-two months."
"Holy city": seems to refer to Jerusalem (cf. Luke 21:24).
"forty-two months": This is three and a half years, which is half of the sacred number seven.

Verse 3
And I will give power to my two witnesses, and they will prophesy one thousand two hundred and sixty days, clothed in sackcloth.
"Power": This word is not in the Greek text, but is implied; added here for clarification.
"one thousand two hundred and sixty days": Since the Hebrew calendar is composed of twelve 30-day months, this represents three and a half years.

Verse 4

These are the two olive trees, and the two candlesticks standing before the God of the earth.

This verse was engraved on a papal tiara which Napoleon gave to Pope Pius VII.

Verse 5
And if any man will hurt them, fire cometh out of his mouth, and devoureth his enemies; and if anyone wants to harm them, it matters that he is killed.

Verse 6
They have the power to shut the sky, that no rain may fall during the days of their prophesying, and they have power over the waters to turn them into blood and to strike the earth with every kind of plague, as often as they desire.
"Power": or "authority"

Two witnesses killed and raised (11:7–14)

Verse 8
And their dead bodies will lie in the street of the great city which spiritually is called Sodom and Egypt, where also our Lord was crucified.
"Street": from the Greek word , plateia, referring to "a major (broad) street".

Verse 11
 Now after the three-and-a-half days the breath of life from God entered them, and they stood on their feet, and great fear fell on those who saw them. 

In Revelation, the symbolism of times does not lie in the unit of measurement (days, weeks, years) but in the numerical value attached to the measurement. It is a symbolic illustration of the apparent victory of hostile forces over God’s people in the in-between age.

The Seventh Trumpet (11:15–19)

Verse 15
The seventh angel sounded, and there were loud voices in heaven, saying:
"The kingdoms of the world have become the kingdoms of our Lord, and of His Christ,
and He shall reign forever and ever."
"Christ" from Greek word christos which means “one who has been anointed", the same as the word “Messiah” in Hebrew and Aramaic.

Verse 18
The nations were angry, and Your wrath has come, And the time of the dead, that they should be judged, And that You should reward Your servants the prophets and the saints, And those who fear Your name, small and great, And should destroy those who destroy the earth.

Verse 19
Then the temple of God was opened in heaven, and the ark of His covenant was seen in His temple. And there were lightnings, noises, thunderings, an earthquake, and great hail.

Uses

Music
The King James Version of verse 15 from this chapter is cited as texts in the English-language oratorio "Messiah" by George Frideric Handel (HWV 56).

See also
 Egypt
 Jesus Christ
 John's vision of the Son of Man
 Names and titles of Jesus in the New Testament
 Napoleon Tiara
 Seven trumpets
 Sodom
 Related Bible parts: Revelation 5, Revelation 6, Revelation 7, Revelation 8, Revelation 9, Revelation 10, Revelation 12

Notes

References

Bibliography

External links
 King James Bible - Wikisource
English Translation with Parallel Latin Vulgate 
Online Bible at GospelHall.org (ESV, KJV, Darby, American Standard Version, Bible in Basic English)
Multiple bible versions at Bible Gateway (NKJV, NIV, NRSV etc.)

11